Najat Aâtabou (born 1960) is an Berber Moroccan singer, songwriter and composer. 

Her song "Hadi Kedba Bayna" was sampled by the Chemical Brothers in their 2004 song "Galvanize".

Early life 
Najat Aâtabou was born in Khémisset on 9 May 1960 into a lower-class family, with five brothers and four sisters. She dreamed of becoming a lawyer, but her life would take a different direction. Singing was her favourite thing to do and she would walk to school every morning singing songs. When she reached the age of thirteen, she would sneak out of her bedroom window and sing at local weddings and school parties for money. At one of these parties, a friend recorded her voice with a tape recorder.
The tape was sold illegally throughout Morocco and the song ("J'en ai marre") ("I've had enough of it") became especially popular. Her family soon found out about her singing and did not accept her choice of vocation. Her brothers threatened to kill her if she continued. She was afraid and decided to run away from home. She fled to the local music shop, that being her first choice because "they played music there", as she later said. That very day a coincidence happened. A famous Moroccan music producer (Mustapha El Mils) walked into the shop, looking for Najat Aâtabou after he had heard the song (J'en ai marre"). He asked for her trust and to join him in Casablanca. Having no choice, she left for Casablanca, where she would stay for three years, living with the mother of the music producer. After these three years, her family found her and they made up.

Career 
As a songwriter and singer of Chaabi music, she told the story of the modern Moroccan woman and tried to improve feminism within Morocco. In (1992) she scored her biggest hit, "Hedi Kedba Bayna". ("Hedi Kedba Bayna") is about a woman whose husband is cheating on her. The title literally means "This lie is obvious". Another song "Shoufi Ghirou", is about women who are in a relationship with married men, while in Morocco it is illegal to have such a relationship. Her songs have evoked social and political discussion in Morocco and brought improvements on feminist issues.
She sings in Moroccan Arabic, Berber and French.

She is also one of the subjects of the film ("Morocco Swings") about two generations of Moroccan singers.

Personal life 
Najat Aâtabou is married to Moroccan music producer Hassan Dikouk and has three children. She currently resides in a chalet in the south of France and still records songs.

Albums 
 1991: The Voice of the Atlas (Globe Style)
 1997: Country Girls & City Women (Rounder/Universal)
 1998: Najat Aâtabou (La Fa Mi)
 2001: La Diva marocaine (La Fa Mi)

References 

Living people
Moroccan feminists
People from Khemisset
20th-century Moroccan women singers
1960 births